The Democratic Union Movement (MUD) was a political alliance in Monaco.

History
The MUD was established in 1963 as an alliance of trade unions and Communists, including the Union of Trade Unions of Monaco. It won one seat in the 1963 elections, with the National Democratic Union (UND) winning the other 17. It lost its seat in the 1968 elections (in which the UND won all 18 seats), but won a single seat again in the 1973 elections. It lost the seat in 1978, and did not contest any further elections.

Electoral history

National Council elections

References

Communist front organizations
Communist parties in Europe
Defunct political parties in Monaco
Political parties established in 1963
United fronts